Eun-jung, also spelled Eun-jeong or Eun-jong, Un-jong, is a Korean feminine given name. The meaning differs based on the hanja used to write each syllable of the name. There are 30 hanja with the reading "eun" and 84 hanja with the reading "jung" on the South Korean government's official list of hanja which may be used in given names. It was the third-most common name for baby girls in South Korea in 1970, falling to sixth place in 1980.

People
People with this name include:

Entertainers
Shin Eun-jung (born 1974), South Korean actress
Han Eun-jung (born 1980), South Korean actress
Kim Eun-jung (singer) (김은정, born 1987), South Korean singer, member of K-pop girl group Jewelry
Hahm Eun-jung (born 1988), South Korean actress and singer, member of K-pop girl group T-ara

Sportspeople
Chang Eun-jung (born 1970), South Korean field hockey player
Cho Eun-jung (born 1971), South Korean field hockey player
Shim Eun-jung (born 1971), South Korean badminton player 
Lee Eun-jung (born 1981), South Korean long-distance runner
Yi Eun-jung (born 1988), South Korean golfer
Hong Un-jong (born 1989), North Korean artistic gymnast
Kim Eun-jung (curler) (born 1990), South Korean curler

See also
List of Korean given names
People with the name 은중, which may also be spelled "Eun-jung" in English, but has a different hangul vowel in the second syllable:
Kim Eun-jung (writer) (born 1972), South Korean female writer
Kim Eun-jung (footballer) (born 1979), South Korean male footballer

References

Korean feminine given names